Guillermo Cabrera González (born February 28, 1982) is a Dominican Republic former swimmer, who specialized in backstroke events. Cabrera competed only in the men's 200 m backstroke at the 2000 Summer Olympics in Sydney, as the Dominican Republic's first ever swimmer in Olympic history. He posted a FINA B-standard entry time of 2:07.17 from the Caribbean Islands Swimming Championships in Oranjestad, Aruba. He challenged five other swimmers in heat one, including Hong Kong's Alex Fong, who later became one of city's most popular singers. He raced to fourth place by a 2.75-second deficit behind winner Fong in 2:08.22. Cabrera failed to advance into the semifinals, as he placed forty-first overall in the prelims.

References

1982 births
Living people
Dominican Republic male swimmers
Olympic swimmers of the Dominican Republic
Swimmers at the 2000 Summer Olympics
Pan American Games competitors for the Dominican Republic
Swimmers at the 2003 Pan American Games
Male backstroke swimmers
Sportspeople from Santo Domingo